Kahaani is a 2012 Indian Hindi-language thriller film co-written, co-produced, and directed by Sujoy Ghosh. It stars Vidya Balan as Vidya Bagchi, a pregnant woman looking for her missing husband in Kolkata during the festival of Durga Puja, assisted by Assist Sub-Inspector Satyoki "Rana" Sinha (Parambrata Chatterjee) and Inspector General A. Khan (Nawazuddin Siddiqui).

The crew often employed guerrilla-filmmaking techniques on Kolkata's city streets to avoid attracting attention. Its creative portrayal of the city and its use of local crew and cast members made it a notable film. Kahaani explores themes of feminism and motherhood in a male-dominated Indian society. The film also makes several allusions to Satyajit Ray's films, such as Charulata (1964), Aranyer Din Ratri (1970), and Joi Baba Felunath (1979). The film's musical score and soundtrack are composed by Clinton Cerejo and Vishal–Shekhar respectively, with cinematography handled by Setu and editing done by Namrata Rao.

Kahaani was released worldwide on 9 March 2012. Critics praised the screenplay, the cinematography and the performances of the lead actors. Following critical acclaim and word-of-mouth publicity, the film earned  worldwide in 50 days. The film won several awards, including three National Film Awards and five Filmfare Awards. The latter included trophies for Best Director (Ghosh) and Best Actress (Vidya). The film was remade by Sekhar Kammula in Telugu as Anaamika (2014) with Nayanthara reprising Vidya's role. A spiritual successor, titled Kahaani 2: Durga Rani Singh, was released on 2 December 2016.

Plot 

A poison-gas attack on a Kolkata Metro Rail compartment kills the passengers on board. Two years later Vidya Bagchi, a pregnant British-Indian software engineer, arrives in Kolkata from London during the Durga Puja festivities in search of her missing husband, Arnab Bagchi. A police officer, Satyaki "Rana" Sinha, offers to help. Although Vidya claims that Arnab went to Kolkata on an assignment for the National Data Center (NDC), initial investigations suggest that no such person was employed by the NDC.

Agnes D'Mello, the NDC's head of human resources, suggests to Vidya that her husband resembled former employee Milan Damji, whose file is probably kept in the old NDC office. Before Agnes can provide any further help she is killed by Bob Biswas, an assassin working undercover as a life insurance agent. Agnes is shot at the entrance of her house before which she is seen enjoying some music. Vidya and Rana break into the NDC office and find Damji's file, barely escaping an encounter with Bob, who is searching for the same information. Meanwhile, the attempts to obtain Damji's records have attracted the attention of two Intelligence Bureau  officials in Delhi—the chief Bhaskaran K. and his deputy Khan. Khan arrives in Kolkata and reveals that Damji was a rogue IB agent responsible for the poison-gas attack. In spite of Khan's warnings, Vidya continues her search, fearing that Arnab's resemblance to Damji may have led him into trouble.

The address on Damji's record leads Vidya and Rana to a dilapidated flat. An errand boy from the neighbourhood tea stall identifies R. Sridhar, an NDC officer, as a frequent visitor to Damji's flat. Bob attempts, but fails, to kill Vidya, and is soon run over by a truck during a chase. Examination of Bob's mobile phone leads Vidya and Rana to an IP address sending instructions to kill her. They break into Sridhar's office to verify his IP address, but he is alerted electronically and returns to his office. Vidya accidentally kills Sridhar during a scuffle, which upsets Khan, who had wanted him alive.

Sridhar's computer data reveals a code, which when deciphered reveals Bhaskaran's phone number. Vidya calls Bhaskaran to tell him that she has retrieved sensitive documents from Sridhar's office. She asks Bhaskaran to help find her husband in exchange for the documents, but Bhaskaran tells her to contact the local police. Vidya soon gets a call from an unknown number, warning her that she should hand over the documents to the caller if she wishes to see her husband alive. Khan thinks the caller is Damji.

Vidya goes to meet Damji, followed by Rana and Khan. Damji cuts the meeting short when Vidya expresses her doubt that he will be able to return her husband in exchange for the sensitive file, and he attempts to leave. Vidya tries to stop him, and in the ensuing struggle Damji draws a gun on her. Vidya disarms him using the prosthetic belly she has been using to fake her pregnancy and promptly stabbing him in the neck with her hair stick before finally killing him with his own gun. She flees into the crowd before the police arrive, leaving a thank you note for Rana and a pen drive containing data from Sridhar's computer, which leads to Bhaskaran's arrest. Rana concludes that neither Vidya nor Arnab Bagchi ever existed, and that Vidya had been using the police and the IB to achieve her own ends.

Vidya is revealed to be the widow of Major Arup Basu, an IB and Army officer and Damji's colleague, who was killed in the poison-gas attack, which also caused Vidya to immediately fall unconscious upon seeing her husband's corpse and suffer a miscarriage. In her mission to avenge his and their unborn child's death, Vidya was helped by the retired IB officer Col Pratap Bajpayee, who suspected the involvement of a top IB official.

Cast 
Credits adapted from Bollywood Hungama.

 Vidya Balan as Vidya Bagchi
 Parambrata Chatterjee as Asst Sub-Inspector Satyoki "Rana" Sinha
 Nawazuddin Siddiqui as Deputy Inspector General A. Khan
 Indraneil Sengupta as Milan Damji a.k.a Arnab Bagchi
 Dhritiman Chatterjee as Director of Intelligence Bureau Bhaskaran K.
 Saswata Chatterjee as Bob Biswas
 Darshan Jariwala as Colonel Pratap Bajpayee
 Abir Chatterjee as Major Arup Basu
 Shantilal Mukherjee as R. Shridhar, chief technical officer at the NDC
 Kharaj Mukherjee as Sub-Inspector Chatterjee, a friendly inspector at the Kalighat Police Station.
 Colleen Blanche as Agnes D'Mello
 Nitya Ganguli as Mr. Das, the guest house owner.
 Rwitobroto Mukherjee as Bishnu, a worker at the guest house.
 Pamela Bhuttoria as Sapna, an employee at NDC.
 Kalyan Chatterjee as Paresh Pal, a clay artist and a police informer.
 Riddhi Sen as Poltu, a worker at a tea-stall.
 Masood Akhtar as Rasik Tyagi, systems supervisor at the NDC

Production

Development 
Sujoy Ghosh approached novelist and script writer Advaita Kala with the idea for the film. Kala took inspiration from her experience in Kolkata, where she had moved in 1999, akin to the protagonist in the film. She reported that despite facing a language barrier and the chaos and poverty of the metropolis, she was charmed by the warmth of the people, which was reflected in the film. Kala started writing in 2009 and finished the 185-page script by February 2010. Her research included reading the books Open Secrets: India's Intelligence Unveiled by Maloy Krishna Dhar and India's External Intelligence: Secrets of Research and Analysis Wing (RAW) by V. K. Singh.

Ghosh, who co-wrote the story and the screenplay, began to plan the film while awaiting the release of his previous film Aladin (2009), but the dismal response to Aladin was a setback. He had to approach several producers to finance him for Kahaani, but was refused and discouraged from making the film owing to three factors: a pregnant woman as the lead star, a bunch of unknown Bengali actors as the supporting cast and Kolkata as a backdrop. Yashraj Films were willing to produce the film, but wanted Ghosh to sign a three-film deal, which he declined because he did not want that much commitment.

Bengali film actor Prosenjit Chatterjee encouraged Ghosh to shoot in Kolkata. Ghosh finally selected Kolkata for several reasons: the director's acquaintance with the city, its mix of modernity and old-world charm, and budget constraints. Kolkata is a cheaper location than Mumbai or Delhi, where most Bollywood films are shot.

Ghosh admitted in an interview that after his two preceding directorial ventures—Aladin and Home Delivery (2005)—performed poorly at the box office, Kahaani was his last chance to create a niche as a director. He added that the film's plot twist came somewhat accidentally. Having described the skeleton of the story to a friend during its development, the friend called him back a few days later to enquire about his film. The friend had mistakenly imagined sequences which he assumed to be parts of the plot, from which the twist ending was derived.

Casting 
According to Jyothika, she was initially offered the role of Vidya Bagchi, but declined; the role eventually went to Vidya Balan. Ghosh had planned for a long time to work with Vidya and approached her in 2010. Unimpressed with the plot outline, Vidya refused, only changing her mind after having read the completed script.

Ghosh chose mostly Bengali actors as he wanted to make the characters as authentic as possible. The role of the Inspector Satyoki "Rana" Sinha was first offered to Chandan Roy Sanyal, but he could not take the part due to other commitments. Parambrata Chatterjee, a Bengali actor whose acting in the film The Bong Connection (2006) had impressed Ghosh at the Mumbai Academy of the Moving Image festival, was later offered the role in Kahaani. Chatterjee had earlier worked with Vidya in her début film Bhalo Theko (2003).

The casting director Roshmi Banerjee suggested Nawazuddin Siddiqui for the role of Khan. Siddiqui, who had only had minor roles in Bollywood up to that time, was surprised that for the first time he would not have to portray a beggar. Saswata Chatterjee, another Bengali actor, was surprised as well when he was offered the role of the contract killer Bob Biswas. He thought there were suitable actors in Hindi film industry for the role. He said that Ghosh had known him since childhood and was impressed with his acting, so he wanted him as Bob Biswas.

Ghosh went against the expectations of casting a popular actor from Bollywood. He signed Bengali actor Abir Chatterjee to play Vidya's husband. According to Ghosh, popular Bollywood actors were not willing to work with him after his two previous flops. He also believed that audience might expect more screen-time from a better-known actor. Several other Bengali film and television actors, such as Indraneil Sengupta and Kharaj Mukherjee, were cast in supporting roles.

Characters 
Before the shooting of the film began, Vidya started to use a prosthetic belly to look as close to authentically pregnant as possible. According to news reports, she met doctors and pregnant women to learn about the typical lifestyle and nuances of a pregnant woman, and also made lists of rules and superstitions followed by pregnant women. Vidya said that during her college days she often used to imitate pregnant ladies during stand-up acting among friends, an experience that helped her during the shooting.

While briefing Saswata Chatterjee about his character, the cold-blooded killer Bob Biswas, Ghosh used the phrase "Binito Bob" (meaning polite Bob), which crystallised the notion of Bob's manners. Further discussions led to the inclusion of paunch and a bald patch. Chatterjee devised the mannerism of rubbing his nails together as some Indians believe doing that helps prevent hair loss. The mannerism was well-noted and praised by the viewers. Ghosh was surprised at how Bob Biswas was greeted by fans as a cult figure. He emphasised that the deliberate ordinariness of Bob Biswas was portrayed so convincingly by Chatterjee that the viewers can expect Bob to be around them at any time and any place.

Parambrata Chatterjee said in an interview that he did not identify with the Rana character, owing to the difference between his own urban upbringing and Rana's rural background. Chatterjee visited police stations and did some research "on their work, mindset and other relevant things" to prepare for the role. The character Khan was envisaged as a ruthless, arrogant, expletive-spewing officer who cares nothing about the emotional or social consequences of his behaviour. Siddiqui said that he was surprised on being offered the role, and wondered how he could portray the arrogance needed for the character. Ghosh built Khan as a character with lean physical build but full of mental strength, loyalty and patriotism. Khan smokes a relatively cheap brand of cigarette (Gold Flake) despite his high official post; Siddiqui had smoked that brand of cigarette throughout his struggling days in Bollywood and thereafter.

Filming 

Filming took place on the streets of Kolkata, where Ghosh often employed the art of guerrilla filmmaking (shooting in real locations without any previous knowledge given to onlookers) to avoid unwanted attention. The cinematographer Setu, who had assisted others in the past to shoot documentaries in Kolkata, said that unlike majority of Indian films, Kahaani was shot mostly without artificial light. The film was shot in 64 days, during which the Durga Puja festival of 2010 took place. Shooting locations in Kolkata included Kalighat Metro station, Nonapukur tram depot, Kumartuli, Howrah Bridge, Victoria Memorial, old houses of North Kolkata and others. The climax, which takes place on the night of Vijayadashami (the last day of Durga Puja), was shot on the night of Vijayadashami in the premises of a Barowari (publicly organised) Durga Puja celebration in the Ballygunge neighbourhood of Kolkata. Most of the crowd in the climax were not actors. Some actors mingled with the crowd engaged in Sindoor khela—their job was to appreciate the camera angles and accordingly apply sindoor (vermilion) on Vidya's face so that accidental exposure of her eyes to sindoor could be avoided.

Ghosh chose the guest house in which the protagonist stays after noticing it during his visit to a neighbouring hotel in April 2010. Choosing a room with windows overlooking a busy road, he proceeded to give it an old-fashioned look by replacing the windows' designer grilles with old-fashioned wooden ones, and by painting the room with some rough patches.

Themes and influences 
After Ishqiya (2010), No One Killed Jessica (2011) and The Dirty Picture (2011), Kahaani was Vidya's fourth woman-centric film to win widespread praise for her unconventional approach to portraying strong female roles. According to Zee News, Kahaani is a woman's film about "role reversals, breaking of stereotypes, turning clichés inside out, a woman's journey, and the way she carves a niche for herself in the male-dominated mentalscape of the society." Trisha Gupta of The Indian Express also finds feminist themes in the film. For Ghosh, one aspect of his project "is a study of motherhood"; the instinct of a mother to protect her baby inspired him to develop the story.

A recurring theme is the fleeting hint of romance between Rana and Vidya. Ghosh said that this delicate romance was "the most progressive thing" in the film—a suggestion that a man could fall in love with a pregnant woman. The director explained that the boy was initially "fascinated by someone who is literally a hero in his eyes", as Rana was awed by the computer skills of Vidya. Gradually, the fascinated boy moves into a zone where he tries to protect her.

Some reviewers note that a major protagonist is Kolkata itself, which is "brimming with warm, sympathetic inhabitants". A review in Rediff.com notes that the director pays a "fond yet understated tribute" to the city by incorporating imagery such as "yellow taxis, leisurely trams, congested traffic, claustrophobic metros, dilapidated brick houses, tapering alleys, rajnigandhas, lal paad saris, piping hot luchis". According to the reviewer, Kahaani did not depend on the tropes of Kolkata culture typically used in Bollywood film—"O-emphasizing accent, dramatic play of conch shells, rasgulla/mishti doi excesses." The director acknowledges that Kolkata "becomes a central character" of the film. Gautaman Bhaskaran, writing for Gulf Times, notes that Kolkata imagery was polished up in the film; noted Bengali director Srijit Mukherji argues that the portrayal of the city in Kahaani was akin to a "Lonely Planet exotica" on the city. Uddalak Mukherjee of The Telegraph explains that Kolkata in Kahaani was cosmetic and lacked a deep menacing presence. Mukherjee argues the depiction of the city never matches the level of Satyajit Ray's Calcutta trilogy, where "aided by bloodshed, greed and decadence, ...Calcutta ..., even though a place of dreams, desires and hope, slides irreversibly into chaos, anxiety and a moral crisis, taking its residents with it".

Durga Puja, the autumnal festival to worship goddess Durga, plays a prominent role in the story. The allegorical yearly return of goddess Durga to slay the demon Mahishasura is alluded to at the end of the film. According to Uddalak Mukherjee of The Telegraph, "Durga Puja, with its paraphernalia of idols, immersion processions, pandals, even an entire crowd of women draped in white saris with red borders, is central to the film's ... visual aesthetic." A review in Rediff.com praised the depiction of the festivities in Kolkata, a city well known for its celebration of Durga Puja.

Ghosh acknowledges the allusions to Ray's films. In one scene, Vidya asks the manager of the guest house why there is no hot water although the signboard had claimed "running hot water". The manager explains that the sign refers for his errand boy, who runs to deliver hot water in a kettle whenever required. This alludes to a similar scene in Ray's Joi Baba Felunath (1979). In an interview with The Telegraph, Ghosh says that the way Vidya looks out and moves from window to window in the guest-house room is reminiscent of Ray's Charulata (1964), where the actress Madhabi Mukherjee enjoys glimpses of the outside world through the blinds of windows. He also acknowledges the influence of Mahanagar (1963), another Ray film noted for its portrayal of Kolkata. According to the director, he was inspired by particular scenes of Ray's Nayak (1966) to plan the portrayal of complex emotional issues between Vidya and the police officer Rana, especially Rana's awe in the presence of Vidya. Ghosh expresses his inspiration from Ray's Aranyer Dinratri (1970) in which Ray "wanted the audience to be inside the car with the four guys all the time. So the camera never leaves the car." Ghosh shot a similar scene, hoping the audience would become "like Vidya's fellow passenger."

Besides Ray's films, Ghosh also admits inspiration from what he calls "visually striking" films of the 1970s and 1980s, such as Deewaar (1975). Critics have compared the fake-pregnancy twist of Kahaani with the 2004 American psychological thriller Taking Lives. The sequences towards the end that explain the missing pieces of the mystery were compared with The Usual Suspects (1995). Ghosh writes that the film was heavily influenced by the colour scheme of the Pratima Visarjan, a c.1915 watercolour by the Bengal School artist Gaganendranath Tagore.

Soundtrack 

The film score is composed by Clinton Cerejo, whereas the soundtrack album is composed by Vishal–Shekhar, and the lyrics for the film's six songs were written by Vishal Dadlani, Anvita Dutt and Sandeep Srivastava. Several of R. D. Burman's Hindi and Bengali compositions were used in the background. The album was released on 13 February 2012, subsequently on the digital music platform Apple iTunes India since its inception from mid-2012.

The soundtrack received positive reviews, and was praised for its amalgamation of Bengali and Hindi lyrics. A review in CNN-IBN states that the song "Ami Shotti Bolchi" is able to partially convey the feel of Kolkata, and that the soundtrack "features right voices with the overall mood of the album". Mumbai Mirror rated the album with 3 stars out of 5. Reviewing the soundtrack for The Times of India, Anand Vaishnav commented that "Kahaani, as an album, stays honest to the theme of the film".

Marketing and release 
Kahaanis first-look poster was launched on 2 December 2011, and the official trailer on 5 January 2012. The poster, portraying a pregnant Vidya Balan and lacking any romantic element, was well received. Critics' expectations were low, owing to the director's previous box-office failures. Vidya appeared in public with a prosthetic belly to promote the film, and mingled with the public in railway stations, bus stands and markets. She often carried a sketch of her on-screen missing husband, and asked people to help in finding him. Social-networking website Ibibo.com developed an online game, The Great Indian Parking Wars, which required players to park Vidya's taxi on a street; it was well-received, reaching 50,000 hits in 10 days.

On 5 March 2012, prior to release, Kolkata Metro authorities objected to a scene in which Vidya is pushed by a man onto the tracks as a train arrives. They requested that the scene be removed, as it would remind people of the past suicides, which had tarnished the railway's image. The filmmakers screened the scene for the authorities and explained that nothing in the film would affect the image of the Metro or prompt people to commit suicide. Convinced, the officials withdrew their objections, and the scene was retained, although it was removed from trailers.

Kahaani was released on 9 March 2012, a day after International Women's Day. It played on 1100 screens worldwide. CNN-IBN reported that although Kahaani was ready before The Dirty Picture, distributors deferred its release, fearing that Vidya's role of a sexy siren (in The Dirty Picture) after that of a pregnant woman might not be received well. The Indian television premiere of the film was on Star India's channel Movies OK on 3 June 2012. The DVD of the film was released on 17 May 2012 across all regions in a one-disc pack in NTSC format. Distributed by Shemaroo Entertainment, it contained additional content, such as behind-the-scene footage, video of celebration parties after its theatrical release, and music videos of the songs of the film. The VCD and Blu-ray versions were released at the same time. The film is also available on Netflix.

 Reception 

 Critical response Kahaani received critical acclaim. According to review aggregator Review Gang the film received a rating of 7.5 out of 10, based on the reviews by professional critics. Good word of mouth publicity played a part in its popularity besides the positive reviews. The Telegraph called the film "a mind-juggling medley of manipulation masquerading as a 'mother of a story'". Taran Adarsh of Bollywood Hungama gave the film 4 out of 5 stars, and praised Vidya's acting. The Times of India commented "Once again, a 'pregnant' Vidya, ironically displays more 'male ornaments' ... than most heroes." The reviews in Rediff, Indo Asian News Service, CNN-IBN, Zee News, Hindustan Times, and The Hindu were unanimously positive, and noted script, direction, cinematography, and acting as strong points of the film. Noted film actress and multiple National Award winner Shabana Azmi lauded Vidya for her performance,"As an actor, I could see she [Vidya] was making all the right moves throughout the film. There was not a single artificial note in her performance." Russell Edwards, the reviewer for Variety, praised the cast, cinematography, and direction, and commented that despite occasional glitches, the "adroit thriller ... maintains momentum and credibility."

Many reviewers criticised the film's climax and certain features, feeling that they deviated from its general style. Rituparna Chatterjee of CNN-IBN noted that the climax of the film was a "huge dampener" and explained, "The diabolic twist at that juncture got underplayed ... What follows is a sobfest ... the apologetic explanation of why she does what she does. Justifying her action comes across more as an effort to appease the Indian morality". The Outlook review noted, "At times, Kahaani is too clever, at others extremely pedestrian like in the depiction of computer hacking and IB operations, not to speak of the ludicrous terrorist angle and the all-too predictable Durga Puja setting for that mythology tie-in." It adds that the "spoon-feeding" of reasons at the end dampens the intrigue factor. The review in Yahoo! India comments that the Durga metaphor at the end was enforced, and that the film over-indulged in Bengali stereotypes. Gautaman Bhaskaran, in his review in Gulf Times, noted that the sometimes-handheld photography was "as irksome as the plot with a sleuth too many and cops galore."

 Box office 
Though Kahaani received critical acclaim, it was a slow starter at the box office, opening to a poor response on the first day, but gradually picking afterwards. According to The Telegraph, the film earned almost  from the state of West Bengal within the first three days of its release. At multiplexes in Kolkata, occupancy increased from 47% on Friday 9 March, the day of release, to 77% on 10 March and to around 97% on 11 March. The film was successful in the international box office as well, garnering  within 10 days of its release in seven markets—UK, US, UAE, Australia, New Zealand, Malaysia and Pakistan, according to Bollywood Hungama, a film-related website. By the third week, according to CNN-IBN, it had grossed , including India and overseas market. Hindustan Times reported that Kahaani made a worldwide gross of  within 50 days of its release.

 Accolades Kahaani was nominated for, and won, many awards. The 58th Filmfare Awards nominated the film for six of their categories, where it won five, including Best Actress for Vidya and Best Director for Ghosh. Kahaani received thirteen nominations at the 19th Colors Screen Awards, and won five, including Best Actress and Best Story. At the 14th Zee Cine Awards, Kahaani won five awards, including Best Film (Critics) and Best Actress (Critics), out of fifteen nominations. At the 2013 Stardust Awards ceremony, Kahaani was announced Hottest Film of the Year while Vidya received for the Best Actress in a Thriller or Action. Kahaani  was awarded the Most Entertaining Film of the Year at the 3rd ceremony of the BIG Star Entertainment Awards. At the 60th National Film Awards, Ghosh won Best Screenplay (Original), Namrata Rao won Best Editing, and Nawazuddin Siddiqui won a Special Jury award.

 Remakes 
Two remakes of Kahaani were released in 2014: a Telugu remake titled Anaamika, and its Tamil version Nee Enge En Anbe, both directed by Sekhar Kammula and featuring Nayantara as the lead character. An English-language remake, entitled Deity, will be directed by the Danish director Niels Arden Oplev and produced by Yashraj Films, with production scheduled to begin in 2015.

 Impact 
Following Kahaanis success, Kolkata became a preferred destination for Bollywood filmmakers. They felt the landscapes of Mumbai and Delhi were overused for several decades, while Kolkata retained its unique visuals such as metro trains, rickety trams, hand-pulled rickshaws, dingy bylanes, palatial mansions, dilapidated houses of North Kolkata, roadside eateries, ghats of river Ganga, British-era buildings, restaurants and iconic structures and areas including Howrah Bridge, Kalighat Temple, Nakhoda Mosque, Kumortuli idol-making district and Victoria Memorial.

Monalisa Guest House, the lodge which hosted Vidya Bagchi in the film, became a local attraction. Several hundreds have visited it since the film's release, to the extent that the owners planned to increase tariffs and renovate the rooms around a Kahaani theme.

The potbellied contract killer Bob Biswas became an Internet phenomenon, the subject of several jokes and pieces of pop art, which circulated through Facebook and Twitter. "Nomoshkar, Aami Bob Biswas... Ek minute?" ("Hello, I am Bob Biswas... do you have a minute?")—the monologue he repeatedly uses just before murdering his victims—was used in different memes. A graphic novel and a television show based on Bob Biswas were being planned,

 Future 
 Kahaani 2: Durga Rani Singh 

In March 2012, Sujoy Ghosh announced that he intended to develop Kahaani into a series. He was inspired by Satyajit Ray's Feluda detective series and wanted to continue the stories of Vidya Bagchi on similar lines, with Vidya Balan reprising the role. The shooting of Kahaani 2 was scheduled to begin in 2013, but in July 2013 differences arose between Sujoy Ghosh and other co-producers. In February 2014, Vidya announced that the sequel was not happening due to these differences, but two years later, Ghosh confirmed that the film was in pre-production with Vidya set to reprise her role. The sequel, entitled Kahaani 2, began filming in March 2016 with Vidya and Arjun Rampal in lead roles, and was released on 2 December 2016. The producers indicated plans to release a second sequel.

 Bob Biswas Bob Biswas, a spin-off to Kahaani, is a 2021 Indian Hindi-language crime thriller film produced by Red Chillies Entertainment. The film, starring Abhishek Bachchan as Bob Biswas and Chitrangada Singh as his wife, premiered on 3 December 2021 on ZEE5. This film is the directorial debut of Diya Annapurna Ghosh, daughter of Sujoy Ghosh who directed Kahaani''.

Kahaani 3: Laila Kumar

Notes

References

External links 

 
 
 
 

2012 films
2010s thriller films
Indian feminist films
Films about women in India
Films set in Kolkata
Indian mystery thriller films
Indian detective films
2010s Hindi-language films
Films shot in Kolkata
Indian pregnancy films
Indian films about revenge
Hindi films remade in other languages
Films about missing people
Films scored by Vishal–Shekhar
Intelligence Bureau (India) in fiction
Films whose editor won the Best Film Editing National Award
Films whose writer won the Best Original Screenplay National Film Award
Viacom18 Studios films
Films directed by Sujoy Ghosh
2010s feminist films